is a railway station in  Otari, Kitaazumi District, Nagano Prefecture, Japan, operated by West Japan Railway Company (JR West).

Lines
Nakatsuchi Station is served by the Ōito Line and is 4.0 kilometers from the intermediate terminus of the line at Minami-Otari Station, and is 74.1 kilometers from the terminus of the line at Matsumoto Station.

Station layout
The station consists of one ground-level side platform serving a single bi-directional track. The station is unattended.

History
Nakatsuchi Station opened on 29 November 1935. With the privatization of Japanese National Railways (JNR) on 1 April 1987, the station came under the control of JR West.

Surrounding area
Otari Onsen

See also
 List of railway stations in Japan

External links

 JR West station information 

Railway stations in Nagano Prefecture
Railway stations in Japan opened in 1935
Ōito Line
Stations of West Japan Railway Company